Mealie bread or sweetcorn bread is a type of South African cuisine. It is sweetened bread baked with creamed corn, traditionally buttered and eaten while still hot out of the oven. The bread is prepared with mealies, which is an African version of maize. Traditionally, it is packed into metal cocoa cans, lidded, and then steamed in the can. In Eswatini, it is a common street food.

Mealie bread (Isinkwa Sombila in Swati) 
Mealie bread is a traditional meal in Eswatini a landlocked country located between Mozambique and South Africa. It takes 20 to 35 minutes to prepare and 30 to 45 minutes to oven bake.

Nutritional benefits of Mealie bread 
 Maize is a rich source of vitamins and trace elements; it contains 26 chemical elements.
 Sweet corn stabilizes blood sugar levels and retains most of its nutrients during preservation.
 Its complex carbohydrates are digested slowly thus providing long-lasting energy.

Health hazard of Mealie meal 
 For people with a tendency for thrombosis and blood clotting maize may be harmful.
 Eating large portions of boiled corn may provoke headache and stomach disorder.
 Canned corn should not be prepared with the liquid containing remnants of the metal can.

Ingredients and general preparation method 
Within South Africa and mainly Eswatini the preparation process has remained unchanged since 1840.

Preparation Method 
 Blend 1 cup of corn, the eggs, and melted butter together until a coarse mixture forms. Add the remaining 1/2 cup of corn and pulse the mixture one or two more times.
 Whisk together the flour, baking powder, sugar, and salt.
 Using a large spoon, combine the dry ingredients with corn mixture until a thick mixture forms.
 Add it to your loaf pan and bake for 30–45 minutes.

See also

 List of breads

References

South African cuisine
Breads